PACE West is a special education school in Gainesville, Virginia.

External links

Schools in Prince William County, Virginia